Melissa Taylor Standridge (born July 12, 1962) is an associate justice of the Kansas Supreme Court. She is a former Judge of the Kansas Court of Appeals.

Education 
Standridge earned her Bachelor of Science from the University of Kansas in business administration. In 1993 she earned her Juris Doctor from the University of Missouri - Kansas City School of Law.

Legal career 
Upon graduating from law school, Standridge began a two-year position with the United States District Court for the Western District of Missouri working as chambers counsel for Judge Elmo Hunter. In 1995 she joined the firm Shook, Hardy & Bacon. In 1999 she left Shook to work as chambers counsel to Magistrate Judge David Waxse.

Judicial career

Kansas Court of Appeals service 
Standridge was appointed to the Kansas Court of Appeals by Governor Kathleen Sebelius in 2008.

Kansas Supreme Court 
On November 30, 2020, Governor Laura Kelly announced Standridge as her appointment to the Kansas Supreme Court to the seat vacated by Justice Carol A. Beier who retired on September 18, 2020. She was sworn in on December 14, 2020.

Awards and associations 
Standridge is involved with the Kansas Bar Association as a representative on the Board of Governors, and she is President of the Earl E. O'Connor American Inns of Court. In 2004 she received the Sandra Day O'Connor Award for Professional Service from the National American Inns of Court. In 2006 she was selected as Kansas City Legal Leader of the Year from The Daily Record, and in 2001 she earned the Outstanding Service Award from the Kansas Bar Association.

Personal life
Standridge is married to Judge Richard Standridge. They have six children between them.

External links
 Kansas Court of Appeals website

References

Living people
1962 births
20th-century American lawyers
20th-century American women lawyers
21st-century American judges
21st-century American women judges
Justices of the Kansas Supreme Court
Kansas Court of Appeals Judges
People from Kansas City, Missouri
University of Kansas alumni
University of Missouri–Kansas City alumni